Abraham Jones may refer to:

Abraham Jones (footballer) (1875–1942), English footballer
Abraham Jones (New York politician), member of 1st New York State Legislature
Abraham Jones (North Carolina politician) in North Carolina General Assembly of 1778

See also
Abe Jones (disambiguation)
Abraham Jonas (disambiguation)